Justin Sawyer (born October 18, 1985) is a Canadian former professional ice hockey player who is currently playing senior men's hockey with the Stoney Creek Generals of the Allan Cup Hockey (ACH). He last played professionally for the Elmira Jackals of the ECHL. He is mostly known as an Enforcer. In his third season with the Rapid City Rush, Sawyer was traded to the Elmira Jackals on December 4, 2014.

Career statistics

References

External links
 

1985 births
Living people
Bloomington PrairieThunder players
Canadian expatriate ice hockey players in Wales
Canadian expatriate ice hockey players in the United States
Canadian ice hockey defencemen
Cardiff Devils players
Columbia Inferno players
Elmira Jackals (ECHL) players
Ice hockey people from Ontario
Odessa Jackalopes players
Oklahoma City Blazers (1992–2009) players
Oshawa Generals players
Rapid City Rush players
Sportspeople from Oshawa
Stockton Thunder players
Toronto Marlies players
Wichita Thunder players